The list of EuroBasket Women winning head coaches shows all of the head coaches that have won the EuroBasket Women, which is the main international competition for senior women's basketball national teams that is governed by FIBA Europe, the European zone within the International Basketball Federation (FIBA).

Key

List

Multiple winners

See also
List of FIBA EuroBasket winning head coaches

References

External links 
 
 

Coaches
Basketball-related lists
EuroBasket